The 2016 Israeli Basketball League Cup, for sponsorships reasons the Winner League Cup, was the 11th edition of the pre-season tournament of the Israeli Basketball Super League. Hapoel Jerusalem won the title for the fourth time after beating Maccabi Tel Aviv 77–62 in the Final. Curtis Jerrells was named tournament MVP. The tournament was hosted at the Ein Sara Sport Hall in Nahariya.

Bracket

Final

References

2016
League Cup